General Forestier-Walker may refer to:

Edward Forestier-Walker (1812–1881), British Army general
Frederick Forestier-Walker (1844–1910), British Army general
George Forestier-Walker (1866–1939), British Army major general